Airline Highway is an American play, written by Lisa D'Amour and set in New Orleans. Commissioned by the Steppenwolf Theatre Company, the play made its Broadway debut in April 2015. It received four Tony Award nominations, including Best Featured Actor in a Play for K. Todd Freeman and Best Featured Actress in a Play for Julie White. Additionally, it received three Drama Desk Award nominations, winning one for Freeman. Its final performance was on June 7, 2015.

Synopsis  
Airline Highway takes place in the parking lot of The Hummingbird Motel, off the titular highway near New Orleans, where the residents have gathered to celebrate the life of Miss Ruby, an iconic burlesque queen who has been a mother figure to them all. Miss Ruby's life is nearing its end, and she requests that her funeral takes place while she is still alive. As the Mardi Gras-esque celebration continues into the night, the stories of the residents, their pain and disappointments unfold.

Productions

2014 original production
The original production of the play was performed in Chicago, Illinois, by the Steppenwolf Theatre Company from December 4, 2014, until February 14, 2015. The production was directed by Joe Mantello with set design by Scott Pask. K. Todd Freeman performed the role of Sissy Na Na, with Kate Buddeke as Tanya,  Scott Jaeck as Wayne and Robert Breuler in the ensemble.

Broadway production
The play was produced on Broadway by the Manhattan Theatre Club  at the Samuel J. Friedman Theatre  from April 23 through June 7, 2015. Directed by Mantello, both Freeman and Jaeck reprised their roles, and Julie White portrayed Tanya.

Awards and nominations

References

External links
 

2015 plays
Broadway plays
Plays set in Louisiana